Urtanis (also Romanized as Ūrtānīs; also known as Ūrtāns) is a village in Shepiran Rural District, Kuhsar District, Salmas County, West Azerbaijan Province, Iran. At the 2006 census, its population was 98, in 20 families.

References 

Populated places in Salmas County